Sowing the Wind may refer to:

 Sowing the Wind (play), a play by the British writer Sydney Grundy
 Sowing the Wind (1916 film), a British silent film
 Sowing the Wind (1921 film), an American silent film
 Sowing the Wind (1929 film), a French silent film
 Sowing the Wind (1944 film), a French film

See also
 Reaping the Whirlwind (disambiguation)